Nor Armavir (meaning "New Armavir") is a village in the Armavir Province of Armenia. The village was founded in 1923 by Armenian refugees from Turkey, who named the village after the ancient city of Armavir, which has its ruins nearby. However, The village is known first and foremost for the Battle of Sardarabad during the Caucasus Campaign, as the battle occurred on the modern site of the town in 1918.

See also 
Armavir Province

References 

World Gazeteer: Armenia – World-Gazetteer.com

Populated places in Armavir Province
Populated places established in 1923
Cities and towns built in the Soviet Union